This is a list of Dutch ceramists who were born and/or were primarily active in the Netherlands.



A 
 Cris Agterberg (1883–1948)
 Aalmis (1674–1755)
 Karel Appel (1921–2006)
 Govert-Marinus Augustijn (1871–1963)

B 
 Gerrit de Blanken (1894–1961)
 Henk Breuker (1914–2003)
 Hugo Brouwer (1913–1986)
 Willem Coenraad Brouwer (1877–1933)

C 
 Carel Adolph Lion Cachet (1864–1945) 
 Theo Colenbrander (1841–1930)
 Lies Cosijn (April 25, 1931 – February 23, 2016)

D 
 Chris Dagradi (born 1954), American artist
 Cor Dam (1935–2019)
 Emmy van Deventer (1915–1998)
 Just van Deventer (1906–1957)
 Sophie van der Does de Willebois (1891–1961)
 Theo Dobbelman (1906–1984)
 Dora Dolz (1941–2008)
 Jan van Druten (1916–1993)
 Lydeke von Dülmen Krumpelmann (born 1952)

E 
 Dick Elffers (1910–1990)

F 
 Chris Fokma (1927–2012)

G 
 Guido Geelen (born 1961)
 Jan van Gemert (1921–1991)

H 
 Simone Haak (born 1952)
 Berend Hendriks (1918–1997)
 Vilma Henkelman (born 1944)
 Derk Holman (1916–1982)
 Dirk Hubers (1913–2003)

J 
 Hans de Jong (1932–2011) 
 Hella Jongerius (born 1963)

K 
 Harm Kamerlingh Onnes (1893–1985)
 David van de Kop (1937–1994)
 Hildo Krop (1884–1970)

L 
 Sonja Landweer (1933–2019) 
 Chris Lanooy (1881–1948)
 Geert Lap (1951–2017)
 Wietske van Leeuwen (born 1965)
 Luigi de Lerma (1907–1965)
 Frans Lommen (1921–2005)
 Johan van Loon (1934–2020)

M 
 Mark Manders (born 1968)
 Hannie Mein (1933–2003)
 Ary de Milde (1634–1708)
 Frank de Miranda (1913–1986)

N 
 Barbara Nanning (born 1957)
 Bert Nienhuis (1873–1960)
 Herman Nieweg (1932–1999)
 Pepijn van den Nieuwendijk (born 1970)
 Theo Nieuwenhuis (1866–1951)

P 
 Gerrit Patist (1947–2005)
 Joop Puntman (1934–2013)

Q 
 Leen Quist (1942–2014)

R 
 Judith Révész (1915–2018)
 Lia van Rhijn (born 1953)
 Johnny Rolf (born 1936)
 Jan de Rooden (1931–2016)

S 
 Karel Sluijterman (1863–1931)
 Cornelis van der Sluys (1881–1944)
 Anno Smith (1915–1990)
 Jan Snoeck (1927–2018)
 Pieter Stockmans (born 1940), Belgian artist
 Jan van Stolk (1920–1997)

T 
 Henk Trumpie (born 1937)

V 
 Jan van der Vaart (1931–2000)
 Thierry Veltman (born 1939)
 Toon Verhoef (born 1946)
 Sophie Verrijn Stuart (1890–1946) 
 Willem Jansz Verstraeten (c.1594–1655)
 Bouke de Vries (born 1960)

W 
 Piet Wiegman (1885–1963)

References

See also 

 Gallery Terra Delft
 List of Dutch artists
 List of Dutch sculptors
 List of studio potters

 
Ceramists